Cyanothamnus quadrangulus, commonly known as narrow-leaved boronia, is a plant in the citrus family, Rutaceae and is endemic to eastern Australia. It is an erect shrub with four-angled branches, bipinnate leaves and white, sometimes pale pink, four-petalled flowers.

Description
The leaves have between five and eleven glabrous, linear to narrow elliptic leaflets. The flowers are white, sometimes pale pink and are arranged in leaf axils, mainly in groups of between three and fourteen or more. The eight stamens have hairy edges.

Taxonomy and naming
This species was first formally described in 1863 by Stephan Endlicher from an unpublished manuscript by Allan Cunningham and was given the name Boronia anethifolia. Endlicher's description was published in Enumeratio plantarum quas in Novae Hollandiae ora austro-occidentali ad fluvium Cygnorum et in sinu Regis Georgii collegit Carolus Liber Baro de Hügel.

In a 2013 paper in the journal Taxon, Marco Duretto and others moved this species to the genus Cyanothamnus on the basis of cladistic analysis, but because the name Cyanothamnus anethifolia had already been used for a different taxon (Cyanothamnus anethifolius Bartl.) the name Cyanothamnus quadrangulus was used. The specific epithet (anethifolia) referred to the deeply divided leaves with narrow leaflets which resemble those of dill (Anethum) in the family Apiaceae and the new epithet (quadrangulus) means "four-angled" and refers to the four-sided stems of this species.

Distribution and habitat
This boronia grows in heath and forest and in rocky slopes and ridges between the Border Ranges in Queensland and Wadbilliga Mountain in southern New South Wales.

References

quadrangulus
Flora of New South Wales
Flora of Queensland
Plants described in 1837
Taxa named by Stephan Endlicher